This is a list of official business registers around the world.

There are many types of official business registers, usually maintained for various purposes by a state authority, such as a government agency, or a court of law. In some cases, it may also be devolved to self-governing bodies, either commercial (a chamber of commerce) or professional (a regulatory college); or to a dedicated, highly regulated company (i.e., operator of a stock exchange, a multilateral trading facility, a central securities depository or an alternative trading system).

The following is an incomplete list of official business registers by country.

Types of registers 
A business register may include data on entities, as well as on their status for various purposes. Examples of such registers include:

 company register — a register of legal entities in the jurisdiction they operate under, for the purpose of establishing, dissolving, acquisition of legal capacity and (in some cases) juridical personality, determination of legal representation, protection, accountability, and control of legal entities.
 list of undertakings cleared for access to classified information — register of companies authorized to work on contracts involving dealing with sensitive information documents of a government or an international organisation, usually maintained by a counter-intelligence service.
 statistical business register — plays a central part in a system of official economic statistics at a national statistics office.

Another group of business registers is focused on various assets or liabilities of an entity, rather than on entities themselves, these include: 
 public contract register — a repository that aims at keeping track of all procurements, usually awarded through a tender, concluded by the public institutions, making this information available online, thereby providing a basis for monitoring the way in which public money is spent.
 public aid register — an official register of businesses in difficulties which received aid from the state.
 ultimate beneficial owner register — an official repository of natural person or persons who ultimately own or control a company, maintained to counteract money laundering and terrorist financing.
 land and mortgage register — concerns titles, rights, and liabilities (such as real estate liens or pledges) related to real estate, consisting of premises specified in a cadaster, such as land, buildings, or condominium units,
 cadaster — determines the geospatial localization, the extent, and (in some cases) the value of premises, including land parcels, buildings, and condominium units, which together form real estate, subject to rights and liabilities registered in a land and mortgage register,
 vehicle register (such as those for motor vehicles, rolling stock, boat or ships, or aircraft) — includes entries containing data on vehicle identification number, vehicle registration plate number, vehicle title, type approval, vehicle inspections, liability insurance, as well as vehicle liens, such as maritime liens, and which sometimes may be connected to a register of pledges or tax liens.
 register of pledges — includes entries concerning liabilities (pledges and voluntary specific liens) of a pledgor to a creditor, secured by tying them to a pledgor's collateral, such as a movable, a security, or an intellectual property right.
 industrial property register — an official database containing registered trade marks, as well as patented inventions, industrial designs, utility models, or integrated circuits, thus protecting and reserving the rights of the company which developed them or bought rights to them.
 plant breeders’ rights register — registers rights to a protected plant variety, developed and registered by a plant breeder.

Some types of business registers combine the features of both groups, these include:
 tax register — a register used for the purpose of revenue collection, including taxes, duties such as tariffs or excise, as well as mandatory social insurance and health insurance contributions; such a register includes all taxable entities, as well as their tax liabilities, including tax liens.
 public company and securities register — the official repository of publicly-listed or unlisted companies whose at least one emission of securities was offered for the purpose of free trading to a number of persons exceeding certain threshold (varying according to jurisdiction), thus placing such a company under specific regulatory obligations, mainly concerning mandatory publication of information on the terms and rights attached to the offered security, as well as information on the company itself and its finances.
 list of companies and their securities publicly traded on a stock market — maintained by a stock exchange or an alternative trading system for the purpose of trading and quoting companies’ stocks.
 insolvency register — contains information on companies who entered insolvency, bankruptcy, liquidation, administration, receivership, debt restructuring, or have been under futile execution, either of an administrative debt (by a government agency) or of a private debt (by a bailiff), for longer than an amount of time specified by law, as well as on their liabilities.
 register or a list of a specified type of regulated entities or activities — contains entries on companies officially authorized to perform a specified type of business, where prior obtaining of a permit, a license, a concession, or registration on such a list or register is a prerequisite required by law. Depending on situation, regulation may apply to an entity type, or to a type of entity's activity.

European Union and the European Economic Area 
 company registers
 European Commission - the Business Registers Interconnection System (BRIS)  (uses data from national registers operated by the member states) (searchable); List of European Research Infrastructure Consortia (online web list)
 European Committee of the Regions - Register of European Groupings of Territorial Cooperation (uses data from national lists operated by the member states)  (available unrestricted as a search engine and a GIS/cadaster)
 the Authority for European Political Parties and European Political Foundations - Register of European political parties and European political foundations (EU only)  (online web lists)
 tax registers (European Commission)
 VAT Information Exchange System (uses data from national registers operated by the member states) - taxpayers who obtained registration allowing to perform intra-community supply transactions; not mandatory for VAT-exempt entities involved in intra-commumity supply transactions of low worth in the given year, unless they do not perform services by delegating their employees to another EU country (online VAT number check)
 System of Exchange of Excise Data (SEED) (uses data from national lists operated by the member states) -  (SEED number check)
 Registered Exporter System (REX) (central register with input operated by the member states)  (REX number check)
 Economic Operator Identification and Registration System (EORI) (central register with input operated by the member states) –  (EORI number check)
 Economic Operator Systems Authorized Economic Operator (central register with input operated by the member states) – Authorized Economic Operator Database  (searchable)
vehicle registers
 EU Fleet Register (EU only, uses data from national lists operated by the member states) - registry of maritime commercial vessels used in fisheries within the Common Fisheries Policy  (searchable)
 EUCARIS (European Car and Driving License Information System)

Austria 
 Wiener Zeitung  — the official gazette. (languages: German only)
 Firmenbuch — the searchable database. (languages: German only)
 Financial Market Authority (FMA) — has searchable database for companies that hold FMA-issued licenses. (languages: German only)

Belgium 
 KBO Public Search — searchable database for public information on every registered active enterprise and establishment in Belgium. (languages: Dutch, French)
 Central Balance Sheet Office (National Bank of Belgium) — has the accounts of companies, associations, and foundations active in Belgium. (languages: Dutch, French, German, English)
 Crossroads Bank for Enterprises
 Enterprise Search — maintained by the Federal Public Service Justice (languages: French only)
 Public companies register (STORI) — maintained by the Financial Services and Markets Authority

Bulgaria 
 Trade Register — electronic register. Companies must be entered into the commercial register that is kept with the relevant district court, where they can be viewed by the public. (languages: Bulgarian only)
D&B Report Guide Bulgaria — information on the different types of companies
 Trade Register (Bulgarian Chamber of Commerce and Industry)

Croatia 
Biznet — provides information and statistics on the Croatian economy, and access to the Register of Business Entities. It is maintained by the Croatian Chamber of Commerce Biznet. (languages: Croatian and English)
D&B Report Guide Croatia — provides information on legal forms and filing requirements.
Croatian Company Directory
 Business Register — maintained by the Ministry of Justice. (languages: Croatian only)
 Export Directory — maintained by the Chamber of Economy. (languages: Croatian only)

Cyprus 
 Department of the Registrar of Companies and Official Receiver — responsible for keeping the Register of Companies, Partnerships, Business Names, Trade Marks, Patents and Industrial Designs, as well as for administering properties of insolvent legal and natural persons.
Cyprus-Data.com — searchable database for companies in Cyprus

Czech Republic 
 Public register and the collection of documents — maintained by the Ministry of Justice. (language: Czech)
Register of economic entities — maintained by the Ministry of Finance
Trade Licensing Register — maintained by the Ministry of Industry and Trade. (Czech version has additional detail.)

Denmark 
 Central Business Register — the official registry of Danish businesses.
 Danish Commerce and Companies Agency (:da:Erhvervs- og Selskabsstyrelsen) — former administrator of the Central Business Register, since a reorganization in 2012 a part of the Danish Business Authority (:da:Erhvervsstyrelsen).
 Financial Supervisory Authority — supervisory agency which administers a database of enterprises under increased supervision.

Estonia 
 Central Commercial Register — an online service based on the central database of Estonian registration departments of the courts.
Database of the Financial Supervision Authority — searchable database of supervised entities. (languages: Estonian, English)

Finland 
 Finnish Trade Register — official company register for Finnish companies, maintained by the Finnish Patent and Registration Office. (languages: Finnish, English, Swedish)
BIS Search — trade register of 470,000 Finnish companies via the Business Information System of the Finnish Patent and Registration Office.
 : Åland Online — companies, organizations and associations

France 
 Trade and Companies Register — official register of over 3,200,000 French companies, maintained by the Commercial Court. (languages: French) 
Sirene — statistical business register maintained by INSEE. (languages: French only)
 Bulletin of Obligatory Legal Announcements — maintained by Journal officiel de la République française. (languages: French only)
 Official Bulletin of Civil and Commercial Announcements (Bulletin officiel des annonces civiles et commerciales, BODACC) — publishes companies registered in the RCS (registre du commerce et des sociétés). (languages: French only)
: Paris Registry — maintained by the Clerk of the Commercial Court of Paris (Greffe du Tribunal de Commerce de Paris)

Germany 
 German Commercial Register — judicial register of the federal states. (languages: German only)
Business Register System — centralized statistical business register. (languages: German, English, French, Italian, and Spanish)
 Bundesanzeiger — official gazette
 Federal Financial Supervisory Authority — listed companies. (languages: German only)

Greece 
 General Commercial Registry (Γενικό Εμπορικό Μητρώο) 
 Official gazette – Company search 
 Athens Chamber of Commerce & Industry (EBEA)

Hungary 
 Court of Company Registration — provides company information and electronic company registration service. It is maintained by the Ministry of Justice. (languages: Hungarian)
Cégtaláló — searchable database. (languages: Hungarian)
Financial Services Register — maintained by the Hungarian National Bank, also provides supervision of listed companies on Budapest Stock Exchange

Iceland 
 Company Directory (Directorate of Internal Revenue) — (languages: Icelandic)

Ireland 
 Companies Registration Office
Company Search — company directory
Registry of Friendly Societies

Italy 
 Italian Business Register — public register of company details, maintained by the Italian Business Register Office, found in local Chambers of Commerce in Italy. (languages: Italian, English)
Infocamere — company register of the Italian Chambers of Commerce. Information can be obtained from Infocamere and via the European Business Register (EBR). (languages: Italian, mostly)
 Infoimprese — (languages: Italian)
 Commissione Nazionale per le Società e la Borsa listed companies

Latvia 
 Registry of Enterprises of Latvia. Registry also publish free publicly accessible database of companies of Latvia.
 Lursoft — database of all enterprises, public organizations, and foreign company agencies registered within the territory of Latvia, including information of their managers, shareholders fixed capital, and annual accounts. The information is based on original documents of the State Register of Enterprises. (languages: Latvian, mostly)

Liechtenstein 
 Commercial Register — maintained by the Office of Justice. (languages: German only)

Lithuania 
 Register of Legal Entities

Luxembourg 
 Luxembourg Business Registers 
 Registre de Commerce et des Sociétés — the official register of companies and associations in Luxembourg. (languages: German, French)
 Business permits 
 Official Gazette "Mémorial C"(Legilux) 
 Supervised entities (Commission de Surveillance du Secteur Financier)

Malta 
 Malta Business Registry — registry of companies

The Netherlands 
Trade Register — company search, maintained by Kamer van Koophandel. In the Netherlands, registration in the trade register is compulsory for almost every company. (languages: Dutch, English)

Norway 
 Brønnøysund Register Centre — government body under the Norwegian Ministry of Trade and Industry, and consists of several different national EDP registers. (languages: Norwegian, mostly)
 List of companies (Agency for Public Management and eGovernment)
 Registry of supervised entities (Financial Supervisory Authority)

Poland

Regular company registers 
There are two registers of entities which are obligated or allowed to register as entrepreneurs:
 Ministry of Development (MR) – Central Registration and Information on Business (CEIDG) – company register for natural persons trading as sole traders or their civil law partnerships (searchable); such companies are prohibited from performing certain activities (e.g. operating a life insurance company), and proper agricultural activity (animal breeding, plant cultivation) of an individual farmer is also excluded from registration in CEIDG; the register does not assign its own registration number, using the NIP (see below) for this purpose instead
 Ministry of Justice (MS): 
National Court Register (KRS)   (searchable)  — register of the majority of juridical persons types, a well as other collective (private) legal entities (there are, however, numerous exceptions, see List of official business registers#Registers of businesses excluded from registration as entrepreneurs); assigns a registration number (numer KRS), mandatory to be exposed on all outbound company documents and letters; some activities (e.g. operating a school) are not available to all entities registered in KRS, but only to those who are juridical persons; members of some professions are not allowed to practise in all of the company types (e.g. an advocate is prohibited from practising the profession in the form of a limited liability company); its constituent parts are:
 Register of Entrepreneurs (Rejestr przedsiębiorców) — the company register for entities other than natural persons which hold an  obligatory status of entrepreneurs: trade partnerships: either entities with legal capacity but lacking juridical personality (registered partnerships, limited partnerships, limited joint-stock partnerships, professional partnerships), or juridical persons (limited liability companies, joint-stock companies), as well as for other types of entrepreneurs who are juridical persons, as well as any of the juridical persons registered in the Register of Associations, Other Social and Professional Organizations, Foundations and Independent Public Healthcare Institutions (see below) if they intend to perform business activities (when allowed by their bylaws, excluding the stand-alone public healthcare institutions, as they are not allowed to register as an entrepreneur, as well as those of juridical persons or other legal entities who are registered in the KRS exclusively for the purpose of obtaining status of an officially recognized charity - public benefit organization, and would otherwise be excluded from the registration in the KRS - see below) 
 Register of Associations, Other Social and Professional Organizations, Foundations and Stand-alone Public Healthcare Institutions (Rejestr stowarzyszeń, innych organizacji społecznych i zawodowych, fundacji oraz samodzielnych publicznych zakładów opieki zdrowotnej) — the other part of the KRS, is responsible for the registration of various other types of juridical persons. If any of the registered entities intends to perform business activities (when allowed by its bylaws), it also has to obtain registration in the Register of Entrepreneurs; in addition, juridical persons or any other legal entities (including those otherwise excluded or exempt from the registration in the KRS – see below) also have to register, if they apply for the status of an officially recognized charity (public benefit organization); however, as an exception, registration solely for that purpose neither confers juridical personality to entities lacking one, nor does it create obligation or right to register as an entrepreneur;
 Court and Commercial Gazette (Monitor Sądowy i Gospodarczy) – official gazette  (searchable);
 Financial document viewer (Przeglądarka dokumentów finansowych)  - the official free viewer of financial documents that allows to download financial documents of an entity entered in the Register of Entrepreneurs of the National Court Register, in particular financial statements, reports on activities, resolutions on the allocation of profit or coverage of losses. The KRS number of the entity is needed to search.

Registers of businesses excluded from registration as entrepreneurs

Registers of some of the types of businesses excluded from registration as entrepreneurs which are available online include the following (the list does not include registries of entities established through a centralized European Union-level procedure, namely the European Research Infrastructure Consortia, the European political parties and the European political foundations):
 Agency for Restructuring and Modernisation of Agriculture (ARMiR) – National Register of the Rural Women's Associations  (searchable);Register of Producers, Agricultural Holdings and Applications for Payment Entitlements  - (non-searchable; however, the bulk of data may be obtained from the Directory of Common Agricultural Policy Beneficiaries - see above); 
 Polish Waters National Water Management Holding (PGW WP) – IT system for protection against extraordinary hazards (ISOK) – Informatics System for Water Management (SIGW) – water cadaster, which includes the centralized register of water corporations, levee unions (input operated at the local level by the starostas) and the unions of water companies or levee unions (input operated at the local level by the voivodes)  (searchable)
 Central Office of Geodesy (Land Survey) and Cartography – 'Land and Buildings Records (EGiB) – land and buildings cadaster, which includes the centralized register of common land management corporations (input operated at the local level by the starostas)  (searchable)
 Polish Hunting Association (PZŁ) – Registers of Hunting Clubs, available on websites of each of the 49 district boards of the Association, located in: Biała Podlaska , Białystok , Bielsko-Biała , Bydgoszcz , Chełm , Ciechanów , Częstochowa , Elbląg , Gdańsk , Gorzów Wlkp. , Jelenia Góra , Kalisz , Katowice , Kielce , Konin , Koszalin , Kraków , Krosno , Legnica , Leszno , Lublin , Łomża , Łódź , Nowy Sącz , Olsztyn , Opole , Ostrołęka , Piła , Piotrków Tryb. , Płock , Poznań , Przemyśl , Radom , Rzeszów , Siedlce , Sieradz , Skierniewice , Słupsk , Suwałki , Szczecin , Tarnobrzeg , Tarnów , Toruń , Wałbrzych , Warszawa , Włocławek , Wrocław , Zamość , Zielona Góra 
 Polish Academy of Sciences (PAN) – Register of (PAN) Research Institutes  (searchable)
 Ministry of Science and Higher Education (MNiSW) – Register of Higher Education Institutions – includes both public and private institutions  (searchable)
 Ministry of National Education (MEN) – Register of Schools and Educational Institutions  – includes also the jednostki systemu oświaty (schools or educational institutions other than higher education institutions) (searchable)
 Ministry of Interior and Administration – register of inter-municipal unions, inter-county unions, as well as cross-category unions of municipalities and counties , (downloadable lists); Database of Territorial Self-Government Units , (downloadable lists in various formats); Register of Churches and Other Confessional Communities , (only the list of denominations downloadable; non-searchable is the detailed part of the register, covering ecclesiastical juridical persons or other legal entities);
 Ministry of Justice - List of judicial enforcement officers (bailiffs) , (searchable), the list is also available as a search engine on the website of their regulatory college, the National Council of Judicial Officers ,
 General Directorate for Environmental Protection (GDOŚ) – Central Register of Forms of Environmental Protection – includes the register of national parks, available as a search engine , or a GIS/cadaster  (searchable),
 Bureau for Forest Management and Geodesy State Enterprise on behalf of the State Forests National Forest Holding - Forest Data Bank - the official forest inventory and the forestry cadaster, also includes data on all territorial units of the State Forests  (searchable),
 District Court in Warsaw (SO w Warszawie) – Register of Political Parties  (searchable); Register of Pension Funds  (searchable only in person; however, the bulk of the data may be obtained from the combined search engine of the Polish Financial Supervision Authority - see below); Register of Investment Funds  (searchable only in person; however, the bulk of the data may be obtained from the combined search engine of the Polish Financial Supervision Authority - see below); Register of Family Foundations 
 Ministry of Foreign Affairs –  List of European Groupings of Territorial Cooperation registered in Poland   (downloadable list)
 Ministry of Infrastructure – info-car.pl website operated under contract with the Ministry by the Polish Security Printing Works – database of voivodeship road traffic centers  (searchable)

Notably absent are:
 a central register of public cultural institutions. Each of the actual or potential parent entities (a ministry, a central government agency, or a territorial self-government unit) is obligated to maintain its own register of subordinate public cultural institutions, which results in almost 3000 separate official registers of such institutions, operated in various forms and independently of each other, each containing only a few to a dozen entries (if any), available on website of each of the parent entities;
 a register of homeowner communities
 a register of common land communities

Other general official business registers
 Ministry of Justice (MS): 
National Register of the Indebted (Krajowy Rejestr Zadłużonych) — insolvency register separate from the KRS, designed to include entries on insolvent debtors: either private natural persons (e.g. child support, maintenance or tax debtors, consumer bankrupts), entrepreneurs, or any other legal entities, regardless whether they are registered in the National Court Register or the Central Registration and Information on Business ; (searchable)
 Register of Pledges (Rejestr Zastawów) – allows to submit an inquiry concerning registered (thus legally binding) pledges and voluntary specific liens put on a collateral, either a movable, such as a vehicle (a road vehicle, a rolling stock vehicle, an aircraft, a boat, or a ship, excluding ships registered by one of the 2 maritime chambers in the Register of Ships, because they are covered by a dedicated instrument called ship mortgage), other types of machines, a controlled weapon, a movable object of cultural property, or on a security, as well as on an intellectual property right; the register is connected to the relevant vehicle, security, or intellectual property right register, in cases, where such exists ;
 Land and Mortgage Register (Elektroniczne Księgi Wieczyste) – contains official and legally binding entries (done by selected sąd rejonowy courts) on real estate rights (including ownership), obligations (such as any pledges or liens), as well as warnings concerning unsettled or ongoing claims, any detected outdated entries (e.g. a dead person or a dissolved entity listed as owner), or any detected discrepancies with the referenced relevant Land and Buildings Records (the cadaster) entry – search by the register number  (searchable);
 National Criminal Register (Krajowy Rejestr Karny) – contains entries on all entities convicted and sentenced for a felony or crime, or for a fiscal felony or crime, either natural persons (including entrepreneurs), or (in selected types of felony or crime) juridical persons or other collective legal entities (such as trade partnerships)  (access to data on a person or an entity is available on a paid request by the person or the entity concerned; on a paid request by an employer, in cases concerning a job restricted by law to unconvicted persons; on a paid request by a juridical person or other collective legal entity, in cases concerning membership of its governing body, status of its authorized signaotory, or acquisition of its shares, when restricted by law to unconvicted persons; on a free-of-charge-demand by an authorized public institution or authorities of another EU state (or a non-EU state, under an international agreement, or under the principle of reciprocity) );
 Central Office of Geodesy (Land Survey) and Cartography – Geoportal  – provides access to the: 
 Land and Buildings Records (EGiB) – the official cadaster of land, buildings, and owner-occupancies,
 Geodetic Records of Utilities Networks (GESUT) – the official cadaster of utilities networks,
 Ministry of Finance (MF) – Central Register of Beneficial Owners (CRBR) – a register of ultimate beneficial owners  (searchable)
 National Fiscal Administration (KAS)
 Central Register of Entities – National Register of Taxpayers  – tax register which assigns the Tax Identification Number (NIP) to all taxable entities, including companies, with the exception of natural persons not registered in the Central Registration and Information on Business, as they are required to use their Personal Identification Number (PESEL) instead of NIP for tax purposes. It is mandatory to include both seller's and buyer's NIP on all invoices (excluding those concerning consumer sales to private natural persons, where only the seller's NIP is required); its validation is available online (NIP validity check) ; 
 List of VAT Taxpayers (so-called VAT white list)  – list of registered, unregistered and deleted entities and restored to the VAT register (VAT status check by NIP); 
 List of EU VAT Taxpayers – includes those Polish taxpayers who obtained registration allowing to perform intra-community supply transactions and to use their NIP with the PL- prefix as their EU VAT number; not mandatory for VAT-exempt entities involved in intra-commumity supply transactions worth altogether less than 50000PLN in the given year, unless they do not perform services by delegating their employees to another EU country (EU VAT status check available through the EU-operated VAT Information Exchange System ; 
 Tax and Customs Service (SCS) – Electronic Services Portal of the Tax and Customs Service (PUESC)  (searchable) – assigns the IDSISC number for customs or excise purposes, and provides access to the: 
 Central Register of Excise Entities (CRPA) – confirms granting of excise authorization to excise entities, supplies their data to the EU Excise Movement and Control System (EMCS) through the System for the Exchange of Excise Data (SEED), and registers their IDSISC number in the SEED PL database (searchable), IDSISC (SEED PL) number validation is also available on the website operated by the EU  (SEED number check)
 (EU customs) Registered Exporter System (REX) – registered Polish entities (searchable), REX number validation oś also available on the website operated by the EU  (REX number check)
 (EU customs) Economic Operator Identification and Registration System (EORI) (for registration purposes only) – EORI number validation is available on the website operated by the EU  (EORI number check)
 (EU customs) Economic Operator Systems Authorized Economic Operator Database (EOS AEO) (for registration purposes only) – Authorized Economic Operator Database is available on the website operated by the EU  (searchable)
 Register of Tax Liens – register of tax liens put on a collateral, either a movable, such as a vehicle (a road vehicle, a rolling stock vehicle, an aircraft, a boat, or a ship, excluding ships registered by one of the 2 maritime chambers in the Register of Ships, because they are covered by a dedicated instrument called ship mortgage), other types of machines, a firearm, a movable object of cultural property, or on a security, as well as on an intellectual property right; (searchable by serial or identification number) ;
 Polish Social Insurance Institution (ZUS) – Central Register of Contribution Payers  (non-searchable) – tax register of all entities (including companies) paying compulsory social and health insurance contributions for their employees (or health insurance only, in the case of professions covered by special non-insurance pensions systems funded by the state budget: judges, public prosecutors, professional soldiers and members of other national uniformed services), as well as natural persons obligated to pay social and/or health insurance contributions for themselves (including sole traders, partners of a civil law partnership, registered partnership, limited partnership, limited joint-stock partnership, professional partnership, single-shareholder limited liability company, as well as artists), and people paying voluntary social and/or health insurance contributions; the register does not include individual farmers paying their social and health insurance contributions to the separate Agricultural Social Insurance Fund, as well as members of uniformed services delegated to work an undercover job. It does not assign a dedicated identification number, using the existing numbers (NIP, REGON, PESEL) for identification purposes instead;
 Agricultural Social Insurance Fund (KRUS) - Register of Agricultural Social Insurance and Health Insurance Contribution Payers  (non-searchable) – tax register of individual farmers for the purposes of collecting compulsory agricultural social insurance and health insurance contributions. Farmers paying the agricultural social insurance for at least 3 years may register as entrepreneurs in CEIDG and engage in additional business activities while retaining the right to remain in the agricultural social insurance system, under the conditions that they continue agricultural production and do not exceed certain limits on income from the additional activity. Farmers may also pay to KRUS health insurance and diminished social insurance contributions (limited to sickness, maternity and accident insurance, but excluding the pension and disability insurance) for seasonal workers employed up to 180 days per year for harvesting fruits, vegetables, herbs, tobacco, hop, or flowers. Any other employees of a farmer fall under the general Social Insurance Institution system.
 Central Statistical Office (GUS) – National Official Business Register  – statistical business register which assigns the Statistical Identification Number (REGON) to all public and private juridical persons, as well as all other entities, with the exception of natural persons other than entrepreneurs. It is mandatory to expose REGON on all company stamps as well as outbound documents and letters (searchable);
 Intellectual property registers
 Patent Office of the Republic of Poland (UPRP) – Patent Office Registries e-Search  industrial property database which includes trade marks, industrial designs, utility models, and integrated circuits (excluding those of the four types, which have been registered by the European Union Intellectual Property Office), as well as inventions (national patents), and (European Patent Office) European patents, including the EU unitary patents (but without their unitary effect due to Polish opt-out caused by EU's failure to award the Polish language the status in the scheme equal to that of German, English or French, and therefore, such patents are treated in Poland as ordinary EPO patents) (searchable)
 Research Centre for Cultivar Testing (COBORU) – The List of Varieties Protected by Plant Breeders' Rights and The List of Varieties Which are the Subject of an Application for the Grant of the Plant Breeders' Rights – Protected by Provisional PBR – national register of plant breeders’ rights, does not include the varieties registered by the Community Plant Variety Office  (downloadable list); List of breeders, breeders’ representatives and licensees  (searchable); (some of these lists may also include individual farmers whose farms have not been registered as companies);
 Official vehicle registries
 Chancellery of the Prime Minister of Poland – Central Registry of Vehicles and Drivers
 Central Registry of Vehicles – contains data on all registered road vehicles. Vehicle History service  (searchable by entering combination of vehicle registration number, date of first registration of the vehicle, and VIN number)
 Office of Rail Transport (UTK) – National Rail Vehicle Registry  (non-searchable);
 Civil Aviation Authority (ULC) – Register of Civil Aircraft  (non-searchable);
 Registries of vessels (registration is permitted in only single of the five registries at a time, depending on the vessel's size, designation, equipment, usage, and ownership; some of the vessels may require an additional registration: by a ship classification society, or for the purposes of obtaining the ENI number, the IMO number, or the MMSI number - see sector specific registers and lists below; ships belonging to the Navy, the Border Guard or the Police are excluded from registration):
 Ministry of Infrastructure – Registry of Yachts and Other Vessels up to 24 m in Length  (searchable by entering combination of: vessel registration number; vessel identification number such as HIN Hull Identification Number, CIN Craft Identification Number, WIN Watercraft Identification Number, vessels lacking any of them are awarded INI Individual Identification Number at first registration; date of first registration of the vessel) – responsible for the registration of following vessels up to 24 meters in length: all yachts (defined as ships used exclusively for sports and recreation, including jetski, houseboats, and wooden replicas of historical vessels); inland or maritime non-commercial yachts; inland or maritime commercial yachts up to 12 passengers (including yachts used for paid cruises, training cruises, chartered cruises, commercial lending for recreational fishing and angling or for other purposes); other inland commercial and non-commercial fishing or angling vessels;
 Inland Navigation Offices: in Bydgoszcz, in Szczecin, and in Wrocław – Administrative Registry of Inland Waterways Vessels  (non-searchable) – registry of inland waterways vessels not covered by the Registry of Yachts and Other Vessels up to 24 m in Length; 
 Ministry of Agriculture and Rural Development (MRiRW) – Registry of Fishing Vessels (non-searchable at national level) – registry of Polish maritime commercial vessels used in fisheries within the Common Fisheries Policy  (searchable via the EU Fleet Register operated by the European Commission) 
 Maritime Chambers: by the District Court in Szczecin and by the District Court in Gdańsk (seated Gdynia) – Registry of Ships (Rejestr okrętowy) (searchable in person on site free of charge, or on a written paid request, access unrestricted) – the primary official registry of all maritime ships used in international traffic and owned by Polish entities or other EU entities (if not registered in an other EU country), including merchant ships, excluding ships covered by the Registry of Yachts and Other Vessels up to 24 m in Length, or the Registry of Fishing Vessels. Contains information on all rights to the ship, as well as on all obligations (ship mortgage, ship liens). May also contain entries (on a voluntary basis) on maritime ships owned by entities other than Polish, which obtained temporary Polish registration, maritime ships under construction on the Polish territory, and maritime ships exempt from obligation to register by the Maritime Chamber (see below);
 Maritime Offices: in Szczecin and in Gdynia: Administrative Registry of Maritime Ships (non-searchable) – obligatory registry for maritime ships exempt from registration in the ordinary Registry of Ships (maritime vessels not covered by the Registry of Yachts and Other Vessels up to 24 m in Length or by the Registry of Fishing Vessels, which are not used in international traffic: up to 15 m in length when equipped with mechanical propulsion, or any length when not equipped with mechanical propulsion) – unless owners of such vessel decided to waive exemption and choose to register in the regular Register of Ships;
 Office of Competition and Consumer Protection (UOKiK) – Public Aid Data Sharing System  (searchable)
 Ministry of Agriculture and Rural Development (MRiRW) – Directory of Common Agricultural Policy Beneficiaries  (searchable)
 Public Procurement Office – (UZP) e-Zamówienia (e-Procurement) Platform  (searchable)
 National Institute of Cultural Heritage - Registry of Cultural Property (partially searchable) - operated by the Voivodeship Offices for Cultural Property Protection, include immovable (monuments, buildings), archeological, and movable (artifacts) cultural property, in the latter two cases excluding movable items included in the national library fonds, the national archival fonds or in an inventory of a registered museum
 Ministry of Interior and Administration - Arms Registration System (SRB) (non-searchable) - operated by the Policja and (in regard to private firearms of soldiers in active service) by the Military Gendarmerie; includes all firearms held by private persons, companies and public institutions, as well as their history, excluding the service firearms of the state uniformed services or other state armed formations (but not the municipal ones), issues the European Firearms Pass
 Internal Security Agency (ABW) – (civilian) list of entities holding industrial security clearance  (downloadable list with levels of awarded clearances, and their applicability to NATO, EU or ESA classified information)
 Military Counterintelligence Service (SKW) – (military) list of issued industrial security clearances confirming the capability of an entrepreneur to protect classified information  (downloadable lists with levels of awarded clearances, separately for national, NATO, EU and ESA classified information)
 Polish Financial Supervision Authority (KNF) – list of public stock issues after 1 January 2020 and their issuers (public companies)  (searchable); list of public issues of financial instruments (including public stock issues) prior 1 January 2020 and their issuers (public companies, in the case of stocks)  (downloadable list);
 Research and Academic Computer Network (NASK) State Research Institute - National Domain Register - the Polish country code top-level domain register, member of Council of European National Top Level Domain Registries and Country Code Names Supporting Organization  (searchable)
 GS1 Poland Foundation - assigns the GTIN/EAN codes
 Warsaw Stock Exchange (GPW) Group
 GPW Main Market  – the regulated market;
 NewConnect – an alternative (unregulated) stock exchange (multilateral trading facility), 
 Central Securities Depository of Poland (KDPW) – central securities depository registering dematerialized securities and their owners, and the national numbering agency which assigns the Financial Instrument Short Name, Classification of Financial Instruments code, International Securities Identification Number, as well as Legal Entity Identifier. Its subsidiary KDPW_CCP is the national central counterparty clearing house.

Sector-specific registers and lists of regulated activities 
 Polish Financial Supervision Authority (KNF) – register of securities listed on an exchange or on an alternative trading system; registers of various types of regulated financial entities (list incomplete): banks, co-operative banks, credit unions, pension funds, insurance companies, life insurance companies, mutual insurance companies, investment funds, stock exchanges, alternative trading systems, and commodities exchanges. A combined search engine.  
 Polish Bar Council (NRA) – National Register of Barristers (and their offices)  (searchable);
 National Chamber of Attorneys at Law (KIRP) – List of Attorneys at Law (and their offices)  (searchable);
 National Council of Notaries (KRN) – List of notarial offices  (searchable), available also through the EU e-Justice Portal  (searchable), as well as the Council of the Notariats of the European Union  (searchable) 
 Polish Agency for Audit Oversight (PANA) – List of Audit Firms  (searchable);
 National Chamber of Tax Advisors (KIDP) – Register of Juridical Persons Authorized to Perform Tax Advisory Activities  (downloadable list); List of Tax Advisors (and either their offices, in the forms of sole tradeship, registered partnerships, limited partnerships, limited joint-stock partnerships, professional partnerships, or of juridical persons employing them)  (downloadable list)
 Patent Office of the Republic of Poland (UPRP) – List of Patent Attorneys (and either their offices, in the forms of sole tradeship, registered partnerships, limited partnerships, limited joint-stock partnerships, professional partnerships, or of juridical persons employing them)  (searchable)
 Ministry of Internal Affairs and Administration (MSWiA) – Register of Undertakings Licensed to Manufacture and Trade Explosives, Arms, Ammunition, and Devices or Technologies Designated for Police or Military Use  (searchable); Register of Undertakings Performing Private Investigator Services  (searchable); Register of Undertakings Licensed to Perform Personal and Property Protection Services  (non-searchable); Register of Entities Performing Professional Lobbying Activities  (downloadable list);
 Ministry of Finance (MF) – List of licensed casinos  (downloadable list); List of licensed bookmakers and licensed internet gambling entities  (downloadable list); 
 Ministry of National Education (MEN) – Register of Schools and Educational Institutions  – public and private schools and educational institutions, excluding higher education (searchable)
 Ministry of Science and Higher Education (MNiSW) – List of Non-Public Higher Education Institutions  – list of licensed non-public universities and colleges (searchable)
 Ministry of Family, Labour and Social Policy (MRPiPS) – National Register of Employment Agencies  (searchable); Register of Nurseries and Children's Clubs  (searchable); Register of Social Assistance Units  – register of public and private entities such as retirement homes, assisted living homes (but not nursing homes, as they are considered healthcare entities) (searchable)
 Ministry of Health (MZ) 
 Register of Entities Performing Medical Activities (RPWDL) , consists of:
 Register of Health Entities - includes public and private, commercial and non-commercial healthcare entities, registered by the relevant voivode, without caps on the numbers of medical professionals employed or (in case of private entities) specific restrictions on legal form or stakeholder composition of the entity; assigns an identification number (kod resortowy) to the whole entity, with an extension number for each of its organisational units; the catalogue of the covered types includes among others: hospitals, larger clinics (including dental), health spa entities, nursing homes, hospices, medical transport entities, diagnostic medical laboratories (obligated to register also on the List of Diagnostic Medical Laboratories of the National Chamber of Laboratory Diagnosticians (KIDL), as well as stores (dispensaries) employing qualified medical technicians or craftsmen, involved in retail, fitting and repairs of various medical prosthetic devices (such as glasses, dental prostheses, hearing aides, orthopaedic devices);
 registers of individual and group professional practices of physicians, dentists, nurses, midwives, and physiotherapists (but excluding pharmacists, as pharmacies are registered in a separate register - see below, and laboratory diagnosticians, as a medical laboratory is in any case a health entity or a part of one - see above), operated by the respective regulatory colleges, with legal entity types limited exclusively to sole proprietorship in the case of individual practices, as well as to two types of trade partnerships (registered partnership or professional partnership) in the case of group practices; services are provided primarily by their owners, while employment of other-than-owner members of the same medical profession is generally prohibited, except for only a few specific situations, such as hiring for professional training, or hiring a temporary substitution during the owner's absence (searchable); 
 Register of Pharmacies - with the State Pharmaceutical Inspection organs fulfilling the role of registration authority; includes community pharmacies, community dispensaries (scope-limited, allowed exclusively in rural areas lacking otherwise a pharmacy), establishment pharmacies (in prisons or military garrisons), hospital pharmacies, hospital dispensaries other than pharmacies (scope-limited, fulfilling basic dispensary tasks, with more advanced functions outsourced to an external hospital pharmacy), the latter two types required to be also included as a unit of the parent entity in the Register of Heath Entities  (searchable); 
 Register of Pharmaceutical Wholesalers  (searchable)
 National Health Fund (NFZ) – Central List of Healthcare Providers (CWŚ)  – a public contract list of public and private healthcare providers operating under a contract with the NFZ within the general health insurance system (searchable)
 State Sanitary Inspection - Register of Establishments Producing or Marketing Food Subject to the Official Control of the State Sanitary Inspection (non-searchable) - includes farmers cultivating plants, wholesalers, retailers and other undertakings involved in production, processing or marketing of food intended for human consumption, other than production, processing or marketing of animal-derived food already supervised by the Veterinary Inspection), as well as all gastronomy establishments, and producers or recyclers of materials designated for contact with food intended for human consumption; Register of Cosmetic Product Producers (non-searchable); List of designated yellow fever vaccination centers  (downloadable list)
 State Pharmaceutical Inspection (PIF) – Register of Manufacturers and Importers of Medicinal Products  (searchable); National Register of Manufacturers, Importers and Distributors of Active Substances  (searchable);
 Office for Registration of Medicinal Products, Medical Devices and Biocidal Products (URPLWMiPB) – Register of Medicinal Products and the Register of Marketing Aurhorization Holders – register of all medicines with market authorization in Poland; including those authorized by the European Medicines Agency ; Record of manufacturers of active substances used in the manufacture of veterinary medicinal products with anabolic, anti-infectious, anti-parasitic, anti-inflammatory, hormonal or psychotropic properties  (non-searchable);
 Polish Medicines Verification Organisation Foundation (KOWAL) - national operator of the European Medicines Verification System (non-searchable)
 National Chamber of Laboratory Diagnosticians (KIDL) – List of Diagnostic Medical Laboratories – list of healthcare entities operating a clinical laboratory  (searchable)
 Ministry of Agriculture and Rural Development (MRiRW) – Register of entities producing or bottling wine products  (downloadable list); Register of entities producing or processing ethyl alcohol  (downloadable list); Register of entities producing tobacco products  (downloadable list); Register of entities producing or bottling liquor drinks  (downloadable list); (some of these lists also include individual farmers whose farms have not been registered as companies);
 Veterinary Inspection (IW) – Lists and registers of supervised establishments, including: production, processing and marketing of meat, eggs, fish, milk, and dairy, production and marketing of animal feed, list of veterinary pharmaceutical wholesalers (some of these lists also include individual farmers whose farms have not been registered as companies)  (downloadable lists);
 Polish National Veterinary Chamber (KILW) - List of Veterinary Care Establishments  (searchable)
 State Plant Health and Seed Inspection Service (PIORiN) – various registers of undertakings performing activities related to plant health, plant protection products and equipment used to apply them, seed production, as well as integrated plant production (some of these lists also include individual farmers whose farms have not been registered as companies)  (partially available as downloadable lists);
 National Support Centre for Agriculture (KOWR) (some of these lists also include individual farmers whose farms have not been registered as companies) – Register of biocomponent producers  (downloadable list); Register of entities importing biocomponents  (downloadable list); Register of farmers producing biofuels for their own use  (downloadable list); Register of agricultural biogas producers  (downloadable list); Register of first purchasers of cow milk  (downloadable list); 
 Agency for Restructuring and Modernisation of Agriculture (ARMiR) – Register of Producers, Agricultural Holdings and Applications for Payment Entitlements  – system operated for the purposes of state-funded, EU-funded or co-funded payment mechanisms in agriculture and fisheries; its constituent Register of Producers includes agricultural producers, animal holders, beneficiaries of fisheries programmes, organizations of producers, entities operating a rendering plant, and potential beneficiaries, as well as their farmę agricultural holdings (non-searchable); (some of these lists also include individual farmers whose farms have not been registered as companies);
 Ministry of Sport and Tourism (MSiT) – Central List of Hotel Establishments – list of officially rated establishments providing legally specified services, including room service, bed-making and cleaning of sanitary facilities, at least on a daily basis, classified as: hotels, motels, boarding houses (all are rated category * to *****), trail shelters (rated „compliant”), inns, youth hostels, school youth hostels (all rated category I to III), as well as camping sites (rated category * to ****) and tent camp sites (rated „compliant”); it does not include certain other unrated and unclassified accommodation facilities (prohibited from using any of the abovementioned protected designations of type or category in their facility or company name), registered on a communal list only, such as hostels, holiday centres/dwellings, holiday youth centres, training-recreational centres, creative arts centres, complexes of tourist cottages, rooms for guests in private houses, private lodgings, rooms in spa healthcare entities, or agritourism facilities operated by farmers (searchable); List of Polish Sports Unions  (list)
 Insurance Guarantee Fund (UFG) – Central Records of Tour Operators and Entrepreneurs Facilitating Linked Travel Arrangements  (searchable); Database of Compulsory Vehicle Liability Insurance  (insurance check by registration number)
 Office of Electronic Communications (UKE) – Register of Postal Operators  (searchable); Register of Telecommunications Undertakings  (searchable); Register of Maritime and Inland Ship Radio Station Permits with assigned ship callsigns, MMSI and ATIS numbers  (downloadable list); registers of various other permits, including radiocommunication, radio and TV broadcasting permits (concerning exclusively technical aspects, while the issues such as awarding radio and TV broadcasting licenses, assessment of proposed format or evaluation of already broadcast content, are handled by the National Broadcasting Council (see below)
 Energy Regulatory Office (URE) – registries of various types of energy undertakings (list incomplete): holders of concessions for trade of liquid fuels, holders of concessions for trade of fuels other than liquid; electric energy distributors, operators of electric energy transmission systems; natural gas distributors, operators of natural gas transmission systems, natural gas storage facilities, natural gas liquefaction facilities, liquid natural gas regasification facilities.  (downloadable lists)
 Polish Centre for Accreditation - list of accredited organisations (includes: testing, medical and calibration laboratories; management systems, persons and product certification bodies, inspection bodies etc.) 
 Civil Aviation Authority (ULC) – List of Licensed Air Carriers, List of Holders of Air Operator Certificate  (downloadable lists); List of holders of permits to provide ground handling services to third parties  (downloadable list); List of Holders of Airport Handling Agent Certificate  (downloadable list); List of Holders of Permits for Airport Management  (downloadable list); Register of Civil Aerodromes, List of Officially Listed Civil Airfields  (downloadable lists);
 Polish Register of Shipping – ship classification society recognized at national, EU (both maritime and inland shipping), and IMO levels, member of International Association of Classification Societies; it brokers assignment of the IMO number  (earchable)
 Inland Navigation Offices (in Bydgoszcz, Szczecin and Warsaw) - Register of Ships Capable of Navigating on Inland European Waters – assigns the ENI number to vessels requiring classification by an EU-recognised inland ship classification society for navigation in EU inland waterways, upon their registration either in the Register of Inland Waterways Vessels or in the Register of Yachts and Other Vessels up to 24 m in Length (non-searchable);
 Office of Rail Transport (UTK) – List of licensed rail carriers  (downloadable list); 
 Inspection of Road Transport (ITD) – Polish Registry of Road Transport Undertakings  (searchable)
 State Geological Institute-State Research Institute/State Geological Service (PIG-PIB/PSG) – System of management and protection of mineral resources in Poland – MIDAS  – register of deposits, mining areas and mining countries as well as related concessions, synonymous with a mining cadaster (searchable)
 National Broadcasting Council (KRRiT) – List of public broadcasters ; List of licensed broadcasters, registered internet TV broadcasters, cable TV network and satellite TV platform operators

Portugal 
 Citizen Portal – Company search 
 Ministry of Justice – Entity Search

Romania 
 Ministry of Public Finance – Business search 
 Ministry of Justice – The National Trade Register Office (ONRC)  
 Financial Supervisory Authority 
 Bucharest Stock Exchange – Companies directory

Slovakia 
Companies Register of the Slovak Republic — searchable directory. (languages: Slovak, English)

Slovenia 
 Slovenian Business Register (ePRS) — maintained by the Agency of the Republic of Slovenia for Public Legal Records and Related Services (AJPES). ePRS includes companies (partnerships and corporations), sole proprietors, legal entities governed by private law, societies, natural persons performing registered or regulated activities, subsidiaries and other divisions of business entities and main offices of foreign business entities. (languages: interface in Slovene, English, German, Italian; information in Slovene, English)
 Firmica.si — provides company formation services in Slovenia; not an official registry
List of taxable legal entities (Financial Administration) — (languages: Slovene)
 Central Securities Clearing Corporation
 List of public companies (Securities Market Agency)

Spain 
 Central Mercantile Registry (RMC) — subscription service providing legal Information of companies, statistics, and company names. (languages: English, French, German, Spanish).
 Association of Spanish Property & Commercial Registers — subscription service
 National Securities Market Commission (Comisión Nacional del Mercado de Valores), search by entity — (languages: Spanish)

Sweden 
 Companies Registration Office (Swedish: Bolagsverket) — (languages: Swedish, some English)
 Financial Supervisory Authority:
Listed company search (Börsinformation)
Company register

Afghanistan 
 Minister of Commerce and Industries – Central Business Registry

Albania 

 National Business Center (Qendra Kombetare e Biznesit)

Algeria 
The National Center of The Trade Register (Centre National du Registre du Commerce (CNRC))

Andorra 
 Oficina de Marques

Angola 
 Ministry of Justice and Human Rights – Central Register of Business Names (Ficheiro Central de Denominações Sociais) (not searchable) 
 Ministry of Finance – Registry of State Suppliers

Antigua and Barbuda 
 Financial Services Regulatory Commission (not searchable)

Argentina 
 Ministry of Justice and Human Rights 
 Official Gazette (Click on "Sociedades") 
 Federal Administration of Public Revenue – tax identification number (CUIT) check 
 National Securities Commission – Issuers
 National Procurement Office – Providers 
 Ministry of Foreign Affairs and Worship – Directory of Importers/Exporters

Armenia 
 Ministry of Justice – State Register of the Legal Entities
 Tax Service – Taxpayers
 Central Bank of Armenia – Listed Companies

Australia 
 Australian Securities & Investments Commission – Search ASIC Registers
 Australian Securities & Investments Commission – Datasets
 Australian Business Register – Australian Business Number Lookup
 Office of the Registrar of Indigenous Corporations – Search Corporations

Azerbaijan 
 Ministry of Taxes – State Register of Business Entities 
 Ministry of Taxes – Businesses engaged in production

Bahamas 
 Registrar General's Department

Bangladesh 
 Office of the Registrar of Joint Stock Companies and Firms

Bahrain 
 Ministry of Industry & Commerce
 Bahrain Chamber of Commerce & Industry – Members Search
 Central Bank of Bahrain – CBB Register

Barbados 
 Corporate Affairs and Intellectual Property Office – Registrants

Belarus 

Unified State Register of Legal Entities and Individual Entrepreneurs — Ministry of Justice (In Russian)

Belize 
 International Business Companies Registry of Belize

Benin 
 Ministry of Industry, Trade, Small and Medium Enterprises – Business Registry (GUFE)

Bhutan 
 Office of the Registrar of Companies, Corporate Regulatory Authority, MoENR (not searchable)

Bolivia 
 Registry of Commerce (Fundempresa)

Bosnia and Herzegovina 

  and Brčko District:
Registers of Business Entities
Registry of Securities – Issuers
 :
Registers of Business Entities
Central Registry of Securities – Issuers

Botswana 
Companies and Intellectual Property Authority

Brazil 
 BM&F Bovespa – Listed Companies
 Ministry of Finance – Federal Revenue – Legal entity tax identification number (CNPJ) search 
 State registries 
 Department of Business Registration and Integration (DREI) – Map of commercial registries (juntas comerciais)

Brunei 
 Brunei Attorney General's Chamber

Burkina Faso 
 House of Enterprises (Maison de l'Entreprise) – Company search

Burundi 
 Investment Promotion Authority (not searchable)

Cambodia 
 Ministry of Commerce – Business Registration

Cameroon 
 Chamber of Commerce, Industry, Mines and Crafts (CCIMA) – Company Directory 
 Chamber of Commerce, Industry, Mines and Crafts (CCIMA) – Database of Industrial Enterprises 
 Ministry of Economy, Planning, and Regional Development – Business Directory (Annuaire des entreprises)
 National Institute of Statistics – List of companies

Canada 
 Corporations Canada – Search for a Federal Corporation
Canada's Business Registries
Provincial and territorial registries

Cape Verde 
 Official Gazette

Central African Republic 
 Ministry of Commerce and Industry 
 Ministry for the Promotion of Small and Medium Enterprises

Chad  

 Business Formalities Center of National Agency for Investments and Exports of Chad.

Chile 
 Registry of Commerce of Santiago 
 Official gazette 
 Securities and Insurance Supervisor 
 Ministry of Finance – Directory of Providers

China, People's Republic of 
 State Administration for Market Regulation 
 Credit China 
 Ministry of Commerce – Corporate Credit Rating System 
 State Administration of Taxation – Corporate credit rating inquiry 
 Provincial, sub-provincial and municipal registries
Anhui Province – Anhui Administration for Industry and Commerce 
Hefei – Hefei Administration for Industry and Commerce 
Beijing – Beijing Administration for Industry and Commerce 
Chongqing – Chongqing Administration for Industry and Commerce 
 Chongqing – Chongqing Enterprise Credit Information System 
Fujian Province – Fujian Administration for Industry and Commerce 
 Fujian Province – Fujian Enterprise Credit Information System 
Fuzhou – Fuzhou Enterprise Credit Information System 
Xiamen – Xiamen Enterprise Credit Information System 
Gansu – Gansu Administration for Industry and Commerce 
Guangdong – Guangdong Administration for Industry and Commerce 
Guangzhou – Guangzhou Administration for Industry and Commerce 
 Guangzhou – Guangzhou Commercial Registration Information 
Shenzhen – Market Supervision Administration of Shenzhen Municipality 
 Shenzhen – Shenzhen Enterprise Credit Information System 
Guangxi – Guangxi Administration for Industry and Commerce 
Guizhou – Guizhou Administration for Industry and Commerce 
 Guizhou Province – Guizhou Enterprise Credit Information System 
Guiyang – Guiyang Administration for Industry and Commerce 
Hainan – Hainan Administration for Industry and Commerce 
Hebei – Hebei Administration for Industry and Commerce 
Heilongjiang – Heilongjiang Administration for Industry and Commerce 
 Heilongjiang Province – Heilongjiang Enterprise Credit Information System 
Harbin – Harbin Enterprise Credit Information System 
Henan – Henan Administration for Industry and Commerce 
Hubei – Hubei Administration for Industry and Commerce 
Wuhan – Wuhan Administration for Industry and Commerce 
Hunan – Hunan Administration for Industry and Commerce 
 Hunan Province – Hunan Enterprise Credit Information System 
Inner Mongolia – Inner Mongolia Administration for Industry and Commerce 
 Inner Mongolia – Inner Mongolia Enterprise Credit Information System 
Jiangsu -– Jiangsu Administration for Industry and Commerce  
Wuxi – Wuxi Enterprise Credit Information System 
Jiangxi – Jiangxi Administration for Industry and Commerce 
Jilin – Jilin Administration for Industry and Commerce 
Liaoning – Liaoning Administration for Industry and Commerce 
 Liaoning Province – Liaoning Enterprise Credit Information System 
Dalian – Dalian Administration for Industry and Commerce 
Dandong – Dandong Administration for Industry and Commerce 
Shenyang – Shenyang Administration for Industry and Commerce 
Ningxia Hui Autonomous Region – Ningxia Administration for Industry and Commerce 
Qinghai – Qinghai Administration for Industry and Commerce 
Shaanxi – Shaanxi Administration for Industry and Commerce 
 Shaanxi Province – Shaanxi enterprise credit information system 
Xi'an – Xi'an Administration for Industry and Commerce 
Shandong – Shandong Administration for Industry and Commerce 
Dongying – Dongying Enterprise Credit Information System 
Qingdao – Qingdao Administration for Industry and Commerce 
Weihai – Weihai Administration for Industry and Commerce 
Shanghai – Shanghai Administration for Industry and Commerce 
Shanxi – Shanxi Administration for Industry and Commerce 
Sichuan – Sichuan Administration for Industry and Commerce 
 Sichuan Province – Sichuan Enterprise Credit Information System 
Chengdu – Chengdu Administration for Industry and Commerce 
Tianjin – Tianjin City Administration for Industry and Commerce 
Binhai – Binhai company search 
Tibet Autonomous Region – Tibet Administration for Industry and Commerce 
Xinjiang Uyghur Autonomous Region – Xinjiang Administration for Industry and Commerce 
Yunnan – Yunnan Administration for Industry and Commerce 
Kunming – Kunming Administration for Industry and Commerce 
Zhejiang – Zhejiang Administration for Industry and Commerce 
 Zhejiang Province – Zhejiang Enterprise Credit Information System 
Hangzhou – Hangzhou Administration for Industry and Commerce 
 Hangzhou – Hangzhou Enterprise Credit Information System 
Special Administrative Territories
 Hong Kong 
 Hong Kong Integrated Companies Registry Information System (ICRIS) – Companies Register
Inland Revenue Department – Business Registration Number Enquiry
Securities and Futures Commission – Public Register of Licensed Persons and Registered Institutions
Macau
Government Printing Bureau
 Directorate of Justice Affairs Services (not searchable)

China, Republic of (Taiwan) 
 Ministry of Economic Affairs
Company Registration Enquiry 
Business registration lists 
Business registration lists (by municipality) 
List of Taiwanese companies in mainland China 
List of Taiwanese companies doing business outside of Taiwan 
List of non-Taiwanese companies registered in Taiwan 
 Taiwan Stock Exchange – Market Observation Post System

Colombia 
 Unified Commercial and Social Registry (RUES) 
 Superintendency of Corporations
Business Check 
SIREM Company Search 
 Superintendencia Financiera de Colombia – Comprehensive Stock Market Information System (SIMEV)

Congo, Democratic Republic of the 
 Ministry of Justice and Human Rights – Business Registry (Guichet unique)

Congo, Republic of the 
 National Center for Statistics and Economic Studies  – "Base de données"
 Official gazette

Cook Islands 
 Financial Supervisory Commission – Registrar's Office (not searchable)

Costa Rica 
 National Registry  
 General Directorate Of Taxation (DGT) – Company check 
 Government Procurement System – Provider search

Côte d'Ivoire 
 Center for Investment Promotion – Company search

Cuba 
 National Office of Statistics – Registries

Danish realms
: Company Registration Authority
: Greenland Business Register — (language: Danish)

Djibouti 
 Office of Industrial Property and Commerce (ODPIC) – Official Bulletin

Dominica 
 Companies and Intellectual Property Office – Name search

Dominican Republic 
 Generate Directorate of Internal Revenue (DGII) – Tax-paying companies search 
 Generate Directorate of Internal Revenue (DGII) – Companies without operations 
 National Office of Industrial Property (ONAPI) – Trade name search 
 General Directorate of Public Procurement – Provider search 
 Santo Domingo – Santo Domingo Chamber of Commerce and Production

Dutch Caribbean 
Dutch Caribbean:
: Aruba Chamber of Commerce and Industry
: Bonaire Commercial Register
 : Curaçao Chamber of Commerce & Industry

: Sint Eustatius and Saba Commercial Register
: Sint Eustatius and Saba Commercial Register
: St. Maarten Chamber of Commerce & Industry (not searchable)

Ecuador 
 Superintendency of Companies 
 Internal Revenue Service (SRI) – Company check 
 National Institute of Statistics and Census (INEC) – Business Directory 
 National Secretariat of Policy Management – Directory of Social Organizations 
 Official Public Procurement System – Provider search

Egypt 
 Ministry of Industry and Foreign Trade – Egyptian International Trade Point
 General Authority for Free Zones and Investment

El Salvador 
 National Center of Registries – List of registered businesses 
 Official Gazette search 
 Salvadoran Institute of Social Security – Solvent companies 
 Public Procurement Unit (UNAC) – List of providers

Eritrea 
 Ministry of Information – Official journal (Haddas Ertra)

Ethiopia 
 Ministry of Trade
 Ministry of Tourism

Fiji 
 Fiji Government – Companies and Business Registration

Gabon 
 Investment Promotion Agency (Centre de Développement des Entreprises) (not searchable)

Gambia 
 iCommerce Registry

Georgia 

 D&B Report Guide Georgia — summary of legal forms and filing requirements. (languages: Georgian only)
Public Registry — (languages: Georgian only)

Ghana 
 Registrar General's Department
 Public Procurement Authority – Registered Suppliers and Contractors

Grenada 
 Registrar of Companies and Intellectual Property (not searchable)

Guatemala 
 Mercantile Registry   
 State Procurement System – Provider search

Guinea 
 Investment Promotion Agency

Guyana 
 Ministry of Legal Affairs – Deeds Registry (not searchable)
 The Official Gazette of Guyana
 Georgetown – Georgetown Chamber of Commerce & Industry – Directory of Members

Haiti 
 Ministry of Commerce and Industry – Electronic Commerce Registry

Hong Kong 
 Business Registration Office (of the Inland Revenue Department)
 Companies Registry

Honduras 
 Chamber of Commerce and Industry 
 Executive Directorate of Income – company tax identification code (RTN) check 
 State Office Procurement (ONCAE) – Provider search

India 
 Ministry of Corporate Affairs – Find Company/LLP

Indonesia 
 Ministry of Industry – Industrial Company Directory 
 Ministry of Trade – Corporate Directory
 Indonesian Chamber of Commerce and Industry (KADIN) 
 Indonesia Charter bus – Transportation

Iran 
 Iranian Judiciary System - under (SSAA) Legal Entities National ID Portal   Official Journal (RRK)  older archived url https://web.archive.org/web/gazette.ir
 Official Journal (Dastour) 
 Tehran – Tehran Chamber of Commerce and Industries and Mines – Trade Directory

Iraq 
 Ministry of Trade – Iraq Registrar of Companies
 Baghdad – Chamber of Commerce – Companies Search 
 Erbil – Chamber of Commerce and Industry – Companies List

Israel 
 Justice Ministry – Israeli Corporations Authority
 Justice Ministry – Israeli Corporations Authority   – Additional details available in company extract
 Israel Securities Authority – List of Public Companies
 Ministry of Construction – Contractors Registrar

Jamaica 
 Office of the Registrar of Companies
 National Contracts Commission – Registered Contractors

Japan 
 Ministry of Economy, Trade and Industry – Company Search

Jordan 
 Companies Control Department 
 Ministry of Industry and Trade – Trade Names
 Securities Depository Center – Public Shareholding Companies

Kazakhstan 
 Ministry of Justice – Database of legal entities
 State Revenue Committee – Legal entities
 Business Licenses

Kenya 
 State Law Office – Registrar General (not searchable)
 National Construction Authority – Registered Contractors

Kiribati 
 Ministry of Commerce, Industry and Cooperatives (not searchable)

Kosovo 
 Ministry of Trade and Industry – Business Registration Agency

Kuwait 
 Kuwait Chamber of Commerce and Industry – Company Search 
 Kuwait Stock Exchange – Listed Companies

Kyrgyzstan 
 Ministry of Justice – Register of Legal Entities

Laos 
 Ministry of Industry and Commerce – Registered Enterprises

Lebanon 
 Investment Development Authority of Lebanon

Lesotho 
 Ministry of Trade, Industry, Cooperatives and Marketing

Liberia 
 Liberia Business Registry

Libya 
 Libyan Commercial Registry.  Available only for Libyan residents after  registration.

Madagascar 
 Economic Development Board of Madagascar – List of companies
 General Directorate of Taxes (DGI) – Taxable entity search

Malawi 
 Ministry of Justice and Constitutional Affairs – Registrar General (not searchable)

Malaysia 
 Companies Commission of Malaysia – Company search  
 Labuan – Labuan Financial Services Authority

Maldives 
 Ministry of Economic Development

Mali 
 Investment Promotion Agency

Marshall Islands 
 Marshall Islands Maritime & Corporate Administrators

Mauritania 
 Chamber of Commerce, Industry, and Agriculture (Click on "Répertoires des entreprises")

Mauritius 
 Ministry of Finance and Economic Development – Corporate and Business Registration Department

Mexico 
 Secretariat of Economy
National Business Information Registry (SIEM) 
Company name search 
Integrated System of Registry Management (SIGER) – list of all state and municipal commercial registries 
 Mexican Institute of Industrial Property – Trade name search 
 Registry of Suppliers and Contractors (RUPC) 
 ProMéxico – Directory of Exporters 
 State registries

Micronesia, Federated States of 
 Registrar of Companies – Listing of FSM Corporations

Moldova 

 Licensing Chamber
 Ministry of Justice
State Registration Chamber 
State Register of non-profit Organizations 
 State Tax Service
Taxable entity search  – search by Unique State Identification Number (IDNO)
List of taxable entities

Monaco 
 Registry of Commerce and Industry

Montenegro 

 Central Registry of Business Entities
 Montenegro Stock Exchange – Company search

Mongolia 
 General Authority for State Registration

Morocco 
 Central Trade Registry (OMPIC)   
 Central Trade Registry (OMPIC) 
 Financial Markets Authority (CDVM) – Listed Companies
Casablanca – Register of Commerce 
Fès – Register of Commerce 
Marrakech – Register of Commerce 
Meknès – Register of Commerce 
Oujda – Register of Commerce 
Rabat – Register of Commerce 
Salé – Register of Commerce 
Tangier – Register of Commerce

Mozambique 
 Bulletin of the Republic

Myanmar 
 Directorate of Investment and Company Administration

Namibia 
 Business and Intellectual Property Authority

Nauru 
 Registrar of Corporations

Nepal 
 Office of Company Registrar

New Zealand 
 Companies Office – Search for companies, company directors or shareholders

Nicaragua 
 Ministry of Development, Industry and Trade 
 General Revenue Service (DGI) – Business search 
 General Directorate of State Procurement – Provider search

Niger 
 National Institute of Statistics – Directory of Companies

Nigeria 
 Corporate Affairs Commission
 Bureau of Public Procurement – Registered Contractors

Niue 
 Companies Office of Niue

North Macedonia 
 Central Registry 
 Securities and Exchange Commission – Registry of joint stock companies

Oman 
 Ministry of Commerce and Industry – Search Company Listings
 Oman Chamber of Commerce and Industry – Trade Directory

Pakistan 

 Securities and Exchange Commission of Pakistan – Company Name Search

Palau 
 Office of the Attorney General – Registrar of Corporations (not searchable)

Palestine 
 Ministry of National Economy – Companies Registry

Panama 
 Public Registry of Panama  
 Panadata

Papua New Guinea 
 Investment Promotion Authority – Entity Search

Paraguay 
 Ministry of Finance – Taxable entity search 
 Undersecretary of State Taxation (SET) – company tax identification number (RUC) check 
 National Directorate of Public Procurement – Provider search

Peru 
 National Superintendency of Public Registries (SUNARP) 
 National Superintendency of Customs and Tax Administration (SUNAT) 
 National Superintendency for Banks, Insurance Companies and Pension Fund Administrators (SBS) 
 National Superintendency for the Securities Market (SMV) - Supervised companies search 
 Supervisory Agency for State Contracts (OSCE) – Provider search

Philippines 
 Department of Trade and Industry – Business Name Registration System

Qatar 
 Ministry of Business and Trade – Companies Control Department (Hukoomi) 
 Qatar Chamber of Commerce and Industry – Business Directory
 Qatar Financial Centre Authority – Public Register

Russia 

 Federal Tax Service – Unified State Register of Legal Entities 
 National Classifier of Enterprises and Organizations

Rwanda 
 Office of the Registrar General (ORG)
 Rwanda Revenue Authority – VAT Registered Taxpayers

San Marino 

 Trade Register

Saint Kitts and Nevis 
 Financial Services Regulatory Commission – Registrar of Companies 
 Nevis Financial Regulatory Services Commission

Saint Lucia 
 Registry of Companies and Intellectual Property (ROCIP)
 Registry of International Business Companies and International Trusts (Pinnacle)

Saint Vincent and the Grenadines 
 Commerce and Intellectual Property Office

Samoa 
 Samoa Business Registry

São Tomé and Príncipe 
 Ministry of Justice – Company Registry

Saudi Arabia 
 Ministry of Commerce and Industry 
 Saudi Arabian General Investment Authority – License Search 
 Riyadh – Riyadh Chamber of Commerce & Industry 
 Jeddah – Jeddah Chamber of Commerce & Industry – Business Directory

Senegal 
 Business Creation Support Bureau

Serbia 

 Serbian Business Registers Agency — runs three registers. (languages: Serbian)
Business Register — business entities and entrepreneurs
Register of Pledges over Movable Property and Rights
Register of Financial Leasing
Central Securities Depository and Clearing House — includes ownership structure of companies
 Public Company Register — maintained by the Securities Commission. (languages: Serbian)
 Lists of Providers of Financial Services (National Bank of Serbia)

Seychelles 
 Seychelles Business Register (onshore companies only)
 Seychelles Financial Services Authority (not searchable)

Sierra Leone 
 Office of the Administrator and Registrar General

Singapore 
 Accounting and Corporate Regulatory Authority – Entity search  
 Inland Revenue Authority of Singapore – GST Registered Business Search
 Monetary Authority of Singapore – Financial Institutions Directory

Solomon Islands 
 Solomon Islands Business Registry

South Africa 
 Companies and Intellectual Property Commission (CIPC)

South Korea 
 Start-Biz Online 
 Small and Medium Business Administration 
 Supreme Court – Registry 
 Financial Supervisory Service – Repository of Korea's Corporate Filings

South Sudan 
 Ministry of Justice – Business Registry (not searchable)

Sri Lanka 
 Department of Registrar of Companies

Sudan 
 Ministry of Justice – Commercial Registrations Department

Suriname 
 Chamber of Commerce and Industry

Swaziland

Switzerland 
 — Swiss company registers are organized at cantonal level. (There are currently around 45 cantonal commercial registers in Switzerland.)
 Central Business Names Index (Zefix) — maintained by the Federal Commercial Registry Office. Contains information of corporate bodies (corporations, corporations with unlimited partners, limited liability companies, co-operatives, non-profit associations and foundations) and public-law corporations registered in the Commercial Register. (languages: English, French, German, Italian)
 Swiss Commercial Gazette (SHAB) — official gazette that publishes new entries and changes in the commercial register.

 Moneyhouse (moneyhouse) — maintained by the Neue Zürcher Zeitung (NZZ). Contains information of ultimate beneficial owners, corporate bodies and public-law corporations registered in the Commercial Register.  (languages: English, French, German, Italian)

Tajikistan 
 Tax Committee – Register of Legal Entities

Tanzania 
 Business Registrations and Licensing Agency (BRELA)

Thailand 
 Ministry of Commerce – Department of Business Development

Timor-Leste 
 Institute for Business Support – Enterprises
 Service Registry and Company Verification (not yet searchable) 
 Official Gazette

Tonga 
 Business Registries Office

Togo 
 Business Start-up Center

Tunisia 
 Registry of Commerce 
 Agency for the Promotion of Industry and Innovation – Directory of industrial enterprises

Turkey 
 Union of Chambers and Commodity Exchanges of Turkey – Turkish Trade Registry Gazette
 Central Registration System (MERSİS)  
 Turkish Standards Institution – Company Search
 Adana – Adana Chamber of Commerce – Trade Name Search
 Aksaray – Aksaray Chamber of Commerce 
 Bursa – Bursa Chamber of Commerce and Industry – Search for Member Companies
 Gaziantep – Gaziantep Chamber of Commerce – Member Search 
 Istanbul – Istanbul Chamber of Commerce – Company Search
 Konya – Konya Chamber of Commerce – Company Directory 
 Mersin – Mersin Chamber of Commerce

Trinidad and Tobago 
 Companies Registry
 Trinidad and Tobago Securities and Exchange Commission – Registered Companies, Individuals & Securities

Uganda 
 Uganda Registration Services Bureau
 Register of Providers

Ukraine 

 State Enterprise Information Resource Centre — official, searchable companies register for Ukraine. (languages: Ukrainian only)
 State Fiscal Service:
 Business Search — (languages: Ukrainian only)
 Register of VAT payers — (languages: Ukrainian only)
 Register of Fixed (or single) tax payers — (languages: Ukrainian only)
 State Commission for Regulation of Financial Services Markets:
Integrated Information System — (languages: Ukrainian only)
Other registers — (languages: Ukrainian only)
 Unified Register of Civic Organizations — maintained by the Ministry of Justice

United Arab Emirates 
 Ministry of Economy – Business Name Search
 Securities and Commodities Authority – Company Details
 Abu Dhabi – Department of Economic Development – Trade Name Search
 Abu Dhabi – Abu Dhabi Business Center – Business License Search
 Abu Dhabi – Abu Dhabi Chamber of Commerce and Industry – Commercial Directory
 Abu Dhabi – Abu Dhabi Global Market Registration Authority
 Abu Dhabi – Abu Dhabi Securities Exchange – Listed Companies
 Ajman – Chamber of Commerce and Industry – Commercial Search
 Ajman – Chamber of Commerce and Industry – Industrial Search
 Ajman – Ajman Free Zone – Directory
 Dubai – Department of Economic Development – Trade Name Search
 Dubai – Dubai Chamber of Commerce and Industry – Commercial Directory
 Dubai – Dubai Financial Market – Listed Companies
 Dubai – Dubai Financial Services Authority – Public Register
 Dubai – Dubai International Financial Centre – Client Directory
 Dubai – Dubai Airport Freezone – Directory
 Dubai – Jebel Ali Free Zone – Client Directory
 Dubai – Dubai Internet City – Partners Directory
 Dubai – Dubai Knowledge Village – Partners Directory
 Dubai – NASDAQ Dubai – Listed Companies
 Fujairah – Chamber of Commerce and Industry – Business Directory
 Fujairah – Fujairah Free Zone – Company Listing
 Ras Al Khaimah – Ras Al Khaimah Investment Authority
 Sharjah – Sharjah Chamber of Commerce and Industry – Business Directory
 Sharjah – Hamriyah Free Zone – Directory
 Sharjah – Sharjah Airport International Free Zone – Investor Directory
 Umm al-Quwain – Chamber of Commerce and Industry

United Kingdom 

Companies House — the official UK body to which UK companies must send their accounts. Companies House has two ways to search for company and director information:
WebCHeck
Disqualified Directors Register
 Financial Services Register (Financial Conduct Authority)
 British Overseas Territories
 : Anguilla Financial Services — Anguilla Commercial Online Registration Network (ACORN) 
 : Registrar of Companies
 : Financial Services Commission — Registry of Corporate Affairs (not searchable)
 :
 General Registry (subscription)
 Cayman Islands Monetary Authority — Search for Entities
 
 Companies House Gibraltar  
 : Financial Services Commission — not searchable
 : Financial Services Commission, companies registry — not searchable
 Crown Dependencies
 
 Guernsey Registry — includes the Bailiwick of Guernsey Intellectual Property Office which administers all trademark and design registrations and activities, and provides information on the intellectual property laws enacted in the Bailiwick.
 
 The Companies Registry — responsible for the regulation of Manx companies, as well as the administration of legislation relating to foreign companies, limited liability companies, business names, limited partnerships, and societies incorporated under the Industrial and Building Societies Acts. It is part of the Isle of Man Government. There is a searchable directory.
 
 JFSC Companies Registry — maintained by the Jersey Financial Services Commission.

United States 
 U.S. Securities and Exchange Commission – Search for Company Filings
 State registries

District/Territorial registries
+*District of Columbia – Department of Consumer and Regulatory Affairs – Corporations Division 
Guam – Department of Revenue and Taxation – General Licensing and Registration Branch (not searchable)
Northern Mariana Islands – Department of Commerce – Registrar of Corporation (not searchable)
Puerto Rico – Puerto Rico Department of State – Corporations Search
United States Virgin Islands – Division of Corporations and Trademarks

Uruguay 
 Agency for Development of Electronic Government and Society of Information and Knowledge (AGESIC) – Incorporated businesses (e-Diario) 
 Ministry of Industry, Energy and Mining – Directory of Industrial Enterprises 
 National Institute of Statistics – Directory of Micro, Small and Medium Enterprises 
 Official Gazette search  
 State Purchasing and Contracting Agency – Provider search 
 Investment and Export Promotion Institute – Directory of Exporters

Uzbekistan 
 Registration of limited, stock and other types of the companies are made on municipal level. Online registration of companies and register is available in the center of state services Bir Darcha.

Vanuatu 
 Vanuatu Financial Services Commission

Venezuela 
 National Procurement Service (RNC) – Registered government contractor search 
 SENIAT – company tax identification code (RIF) check 
 Supreme Tribunal of Justice – Official Gazette 
 Autonomous Registries and Notaries Service (not searchable)

Vietnam 
 Ministry of Planning and Investment – Agency of Business Registration
 Ministry of Planning and Investment – E-gazette search
 Ministry of Finance – General Department of Taxation – Taxpayer Directory

Yemen 
 Ministry of Industry and Trade

Zambia 
 Patents and Companies Registration Agency
 Zambia Revenue Authority – Taxpayer Search (Click on "Other e-Services")

Zimbabwe 
 Department of Deeds, Companies & Intellectual Property

Other 
 the European Business Register Network (EBR) is a network of trade registers kept by the registration authorities in most of the European countries

See also 

 Legal Entity Identifier
 Statistical business register
 Corporate Registers Forum
 European business register
 OpenCorporates
 List of financial regulatory authorities by country
 List of offshore financial centres
 List of stock exchanges

References

External links 

 European Commission – Business registers in Member States
 Investigative Dashboard – External Databases

 Global Open Data Index – Company Register
 OpenCorporates.com – All company registers

Corporate law
Corporation-related lists
Public records
Government databases
Economics lists by country
Registrars of companies